Natalia Botello (born 6 August 2002) is a Mexican fencer. She won the silver medal in the girls' sabre event at the 2018 Summer Youth Olympics held in Buenos Aires, Argentina. She also won the bronze medal in the mixed team event.

She represented Mexico at the 2019 Pan American Games in Lima, Peru in the women's sabre event without winning a medal. She qualified to compete in the elimination round where she was eliminated in her first match by María Perroni of Argentina.

References

External links 
 

Living people
2002 births
Place of birth missing (living people)
Mexican female sabre fencers
Fencers at the 2018 Summer Youth Olympics
Medalists at the 2018 Summer Youth Olympics
Fencers at the 2019 Pan American Games
Pan American Games competitors for Mexico
21st-century Mexican women